John Norman Mapp (1928–1988) was a jazz vocalist and composer.

Biography
Mapp was born and raised in Queens, New York. He was married to Marilyn Patricia Folk Lewis Mapp, and was the father of four sons, one daughter and one stepson, David, John, Brian, Eric, Robin and Norman respectively. He started his music career as a singer with the U.S. Army band during World War II while stationed in Europe. He returned home after his honorable discharge.

Dinah Washington, after an evening of performing, went into a Harlem night club to hear Mapp sing at his debut, and she adopted him as her protégé, encouraged him to continue singing and writing songs, and helped him start his career as a soloist and big-band musician.

In February 1988, Anthony Scaduto wrote Mapp's obituary for New York Newsday and quoted Mapp's friend, trumpeter Clark Terry, who said, "He was the warmest human being who ever lived. Very beautiful, very talented." In the same obituary, Norman Mapp was quoted from a previous Newsday interview in 1986 as saying he "never regretted making music his career...because it brought him a wealth of experience, plus the opportunity to know and work with people such as Count Basie, Dinah Washington, Sy Oliver." On learning of his passing, Arthur Prysock said, "I thought he was a great fellow. He's going to be missed."

Mapp's songs include "Jazz Ain't Nothin' but Soul", "I Worry 'Bout You", "Mr. Ugly", "In the Night", "Free Spirits", and "Foul Play". His songs were performed by Count Basie, Betty Carter, Marvin Gaye, Gigi Gryce, Peggy Lee, and Arthur Prysock.

Discography 
 Jazz Aint Nothin but Soul

References

1928 births
1988 deaths
American jazz singers
American jazz composers
American male jazz composers
People from Queens, New York
Singers from New York City
United States Army personnel of World War II
United States Army soldiers
20th-century American singers
20th-century American composers
Jazz musicians from New York (state)
20th-century American male musicians
20th-century jazz composers